The Sigma SD1 is a digital SLR camera produced by the Sigma Corporation of Japan. The camera uses a Foveon X3 sensor, which comprises 3 layers of 4800 x 3200 pixels (46 megapixels), giving much higher chromatic resolution than the equivalent Bayer array. It uses a Milbeaut image processor. The Foveon sensor does not use an aliasing filter, thus further improving the resolution. 

The SD1 was announced by Sigma at photokina 2010 on September 21, 2010. It was officially put on sale in May 2011 at a RRP of nearly US $10,000,.

Sigma SD1 Merrill
In February 2012, the SD1 was relaunched as the SD1 Merrill, honoring the late Richard B. Merrill, inventor of the Foveon sensor. With the relaunch, the price was dramatically cut, to a recommended price of US$3300 and a minimum advertised price of $2299. Sigma gave existing SD1 owners credit toward the company's lenses and accessories equal to the price cut.

Software

Sigma Photo Pro 

Postprocessing of raw X3F and JPEG of all digital SIGMA cameras

Version 6.x is free Download for Windows 7+ and Mac OS from Version 10.7  (6.3.x). Actual Versions are 6.5.4 (Win 7+) and 6.5.5 (MacOSX 10.9+).

SIGMA Capture Pro 
SIGMA Capture Pro for SD1 and SD1 Merrill: Free Remote Software for Laptop or PC 

Version 1.0.1  (Windows XP (SP2 or higher), Windows Vista or Windows 7 or higher) und Mac User (Mac OS X Ver. 10.5 or higher) 

Version 1.2.0 (Windows 7 or higher) and Mac User (Mac OS X Ver. 10.8 or higher)

References

External links

Product Page

SD01